James Ramon Felak (born 1957) is an American historian who currently holds the Newman Center Term Professorship in Catholic Christianity at the University of Washington. He received his Ph.D. in European history from Indiana University in 1998. His research specializes in the history of Catholicism in Europe, as well as the intersection of religion and politics in the era of Pope John Paul II.

Works

References

1957 births
Living people
University of Washington faculty
American historians
Historians of Slovakia